The Central African Republic women's national football team represents the Central African Republic (CAR) in international women's football. It is governed by the Central African Football Federation. It played its first international matches in 2018 in the Cup of Nations qualifiers. The country's youth national team has played in several matches and events, including an Under-19 World Cup qualifying competition in which the team lost in the semi-finals. As is the case across Africa, the women's game faces numerous challenges. Football was only formally organised in 2000, and there are only 400 players competing at the national level.

History

Home stadium

Background and development
The development of women's football in Africa faces several challenges, including limited access to education, poverty amongst women, inequalities and human rights abuses targeting women. Many quality players leave the country seeking greater opportunity in Europe or the United States. In addition, most of the funding for women's football in Africa comes from FIFA, not the local national football associations.

The Central African Football Federation, the CAR's national football association, was founded in 1961 and became a FIFA affiliate in 1964. In the CAR, there is no national association staffer dedicated to women's football and no women on the board or in the executive committee. With assistance from FIFA, the federation developed a women's programme starting in 2000. A national competition and school competition were later introduced. Football is one of the most popular women's sports in the CAR. There were about 200 registered youth players in the country and 200 registered senior players as of 2006. There are 80 club-level teams with women on them, 20 of which are exclusively for women.

Team
In 2006, the team trained five times a week. As of March 2020, the team was not ranked by FIFA due to it not having played enough international matches.

The country has a national under-20 side. This team has participated in the qualifying competition for the FIFA U-20 Women's World Cup, which prior to 2006 was an under-19 tournament in which the CAR team also took part. In 2002, the qualifiers began with an African Women's Under-19 Championship. The CAR faced Equatorial Guinea in a home-and-away series in the first round, winning both matches by scores of 1–0 and 2–0. The country was set to play Zimbabwe in the quarterfinals, but Zimbabwe withdrew from the competition. In the semi-finals, the CAR met South Africa in a home match, but lost 0–2. The team was scheduled to play a return match in South Africa, but the host country refused to grant the Central African players visas, which led to South Africa's disqualification from the tournament. South Africa appealed the decision and visas were subsequently issued to Central African players, but the team then withdrew from the competition. In 2010, the Central African Republic women's national under-20 football team participated in the African Women's U-20 World Cup qualifiers. They had a walkover win against São Tomé and Príncipe in the first round but did not participate in the second or third rounds.

Results and fixtures

The following is a list of match results in the last 12 months, as well as any future matches that have been scheduled.

2023

Coaching staff

Current coaching staff

As of September 2022

Manager history

??? (2022– )

Players

Current squad
 The following players were named on 10 October 2021 for the 2022 Africa Women Cup of Nations qualification tournament.
 Caps and goals accurate up to and including 30 October 2021.

Recent call-ups
The following players have been called up to a Central African squad in the past 12 months.

Individual records

 Active players in bold, statistics correct as of 2020.

Most capped players

Top goalscorers

Managers

Honours

Achievements

Women's World Cup record

Olympic Games record

Africa Women Cup of Nations record

African Games record

UNIFFAC Women's Cup

See also

References

External links

 
African women's national association football teams